Sophia Yan (嚴倩君, pinyin: Yán Qiànjūn, b. October 8, 1986) is an American classical pianist, journalist and Beijing correspondent at The Daily Telegraph.

Early life and education 
Yan was born to Taiwanese parents in Queens, New York. She majored in English and Piano Performance at Oberlin College and Conservatory of Music and graduated in 2009.

Career

Early career in music 
Yan won the International Concert Alliance Competition and a laureate of the International Young Artist Piano Competition in Washington, D.C.  In addition, she is a two-time winner of the Music Teachers National Association Competition of Eastern New Jersey, and prize-winning alumnus of the 2004 New York Piano Competition.  Her awards include four-time First Prize winner of the Steinway Society Competition, First Place in the Battleground Symphony Concerto Competition, Grand Prize in the Bookstaber Memorial Piano Competition, First Place in the NJMTA Scholarship Competition  and Grand Prize in the Goldblatt Scholarship Competition.

As Neil Genzlinger of The New York Times describes, when Yan plays “the music literally pulls her off the piano bench; she ranges up and down the keyboard so quickly and with such ferocity that mere sitting will not do.”

Yan has performed widely in the United States, Europe and Asia, appearing at Lincoln Center, Carnegie Hall, Steinway Hall, CAMI Hall, Kennedy Center, St. Mark's, the Eastern Music Festival, Niagara International Chamber Music Festival, and the Shaw Festival in Niagara-on-the-Lake, Canada.  Solo orchestral engagements include collaborations with the Battleground Symphony, Rowan Chamber and East Brunswick Chamber Orchestras. She has also performed on the Composer's Voice Concert Series in New York City as well as participating in the Vox Novus series Fifteen-Minutes-of-Fame project.  She also provides the music for the Lawfare podcast.

Journalism 
In July 2010, Yan started her journalism career as a reporter for Bloomberg News based in Hong Kong and Washington, D.C.
In 2013, Yan joined CNN. In 2014, as an Asia Business Reporter for CNNMoney, Yan covered the 2014 pro-democracy protests in Hong Kong.

Yan was a Beijing correspondent at CNBC. Yan covers topics from technology to economy for China and Asia. She works for the Daily Telegraph as of 2019.

Personal 
Yan is fluent in Mandarin and speaks basic Taiwanese, Cantonese, Spanish and some Japanese.

See also
 Chinese Americans in New York City
 New Yorkers in journalism
 Oberlin Conservatory of Music
 Taiwanese Americans in New York City

References

External links
Personal Website
Conservatory Website
Related Newspaper Articles
 Articles written by Sophia Yan (as journalist) at Bloomberg.com
 Biography of Sophia Yan at CNBC.com

1986 births
Living people
American classical pianists
American women classical pianists
American expatriates in China
American journalists of Chinese descent
American musicians of Chinese descent
American musicians of Taiwanese descent
American women musicians of Chinese descent
American television reporters and correspondents
Musicians from New York (state)
People from Queens, New York
21st-century American women musicians
American women journalists of Asian descent